The  or  is a mountain range that spans the Fukushima, Niigata and Yamagata prefectures in Japan. The range contains a number of peaks higher than 2000m and is a part of the Bandai-Asahi National Park.

Peaks
Below are some of the peaks of the Iide Mountains:
  (2,128ｍ)
  (2,105m)
  (2,024m)
  (2,017m)
  (2,012m)
  (1,791m)
  (1,664m)

Notes 

Mountain ranges of Fukushima Prefecture
Mountain ranges of Niigata Prefecture
Mountain ranges of Yamagata Prefecture